Cryptoscenea australiensis is a species of lacewing in the subfamily aleuropteryginae, first described by Günther Enderlein in 1906. No subspecies are listed in the Catalog of Life. The species is present in Eastern Australia, Tasmania and New Zealand, including the Kermadec Islands.

A colony of Cryptoscenea australiensis was first discovered in New Zealand in 1959, with the species surviving due to larval predation on mealybug eggs. Both adults and larvae have been shown predating on mealybugs in apple orchards, with adults also being seen predating on mites.

References

Coniopterygidae
Insects described in 1906
Taxa named by Günther Enderlein
Insects of Australia
Insects of New Zealand